Daniel Břežný, (born 19 December 1977) is a Czech former footballer.

External links

 
FC Vaduz profile 

1977 births
Living people
Czech footballers
FC Vaduz players
Association football defenders
Czech First League players
SK Kladno players
Expatriate footballers in Kazakhstan
FC Zbrojovka Brno players
Expatriate footballers in Liechtenstein
FC Shakhter Karagandy players
Czech expatriate sportspeople in Kazakhstan
FK Drnovice players
Czech expatriate footballers
Czech expatriate sportspeople in Liechtenstein
Czech expatriate sportspeople in Greece
Expatriate footballers in Greece
Niki Volos F.C. players